Stephen James Noyes (born 17 September 1963) is a former English cricketer.  Noyes was a right-handed batsman who bowled slow left-arm orthodox.  He was born in High Wycombe, Buckinghamshire.

Noyes made his first-class debut for Cambridge University against Derbyshire in 1988.  Noyes played 7 further first-class matches that season for the University, the last coming against Surrey.  In his 8 first-class matches, he scored 170 runs at a batting average of 13.07, with a high score of 38.

He played 3 Minor Counties Championship matches for Buckinghamshire in 1992, against Northumberland, Cumberland and Cambridgeshire.

He  now works as a French teacher at the Royal Grammar School High Wycombe, as well as being Director of Sixth Form.

References

External links
Stephen Noyes at ESPNcricinfo
Stephen Noyes at CricketArchive

1963 births
Living people
Sportspeople from High Wycombe
English cricketers
Cambridge University cricketers
Buckinghamshire cricketers